Solar Twins were an English electronic music duo with Joanna Stevens (vocals) and David Norland (producer/all instruments/vocals).

Solar Twins were signed by Guy Oseary at Maverick Records after playing at Viper Room. They are known for their version of Rock the Casbah, found on the soundtrack to the film Brokedown Palace. They made one album, and split after attempting a second, thwarted by insurmountable creative differences.

Discography
Solar Twins (1999)
"Puppet"
"Nightfall"
"Better Life"
"Alleluias"
"Rock the Casbah" — 3:42 (covering The Clash)
"Living Your Dream"
"Earthbound"
"Astral Hymn"
"Out There"
"Splintered"
"Cybersadhu"
"Swayambhu" (featured on the soundtrack of The Next Best Thing)

Further careers
David Norland moved into composition for television and film. His scoring work includes Anvil! The Story of Anvil, November Criminals, and HBO's My Dinner with Hervé, as well as music for US broadcast channel 
ABC's news and documentary programming.

Other appearances
Joanna Stevens also provides vocals for the following projects:
 Delerium
Tracks: "Myth" and "A Poem for Byzantium" on Poem
Conjure One
Tracks: "Manic Star" (background/additional only), "Premonition (Reprise)" on Conjure One
Tracks: "Pilgrimage" and "Dying Light" on Extraordinary Ways
Paradise Lost
Tracks: "Erased", "Primal", and "Mystify" on Symbol of Life
Sleepthief
Tracks: "Here I Confess" and "Ariadne (The Dividing Sea)" on Labyrinthine Heart
Tracks: "This Means War" as a single from the forthcoming third album.

References

English electronic music duos
Maverick Records artists
Warner Records artists
Musical groups from London